The 39 members of the Parliament of Vanuatu from 1983 to 1987 were elected on 2 November 1983.

List of members

References

 1983